is a former Japanese football player.

Playing career
Enomoto was born in Saitama Prefecture on May 13, 1977. In June 1999, when he was a Dokkyo University student, he joined the J2 League club FC Tokyo. He played many matches as mainly a substitute forward. The club also won second place in 1999 and was promoted to the J1 League in 2000. However he did not play in any matches in 2000 and retired at the end of the 2001 season.

Club statistics

References

External links

1977 births
Living people
Dokkyo University alumni
Association football people from Saitama Prefecture
Japanese footballers
J1 League players
J2 League players
FC Tokyo players
Association football forwards